Skywalker family is a fictional family in the Star Wars series, specifically the nine-part Skywalker saga.

Skywalker or Sky Walker may also refer to:

Aircraft
Bilsam Sky Walker, a single-seat Polish paramotor
Bilsam Sky Walker I, a single-seat Polish powered parachute
Bilsam Sky Walker II, a two-seat Polish powered parachute

George Lucas-related properties
Skywalker Ranch, in Marin County, California, US
Skywalker Sound, a division of George Lucas' Lucas Digital motion picture group

People
Luke Skyywalker (born 1960), former stage name of Luther Campbell, American rapper 
David Thompson (basketball) (born 1954), American basketball player, nicknamed "Skywalker"
Kenny "Sky" Walker (born 1964), American basketball player
Skywalker Nitron (born 1966), ring name of Tyler Mane, Canadian wrestler
Skywalker, a Mohawk iron and steelworker in New York

Music
Luke Skyywalker Records or Luke Records, American record label
Skywalker 1999, an album by Kai Tracid, 1999
"Sky Walker" (song), a 2017 song by Miguel
"Sky Walker", a song by Kelly Rowland from Talk a Good Game, 2013

Others
Skywalker (horse) (1982–2003), American racehorse
Cheonan Hyundai Capital Skywalkers, South Korean professional volleyball team
The Sky Walker, 1939 pulp magazine story by Paul Ernst

See also
 Mannequin Skywalker, a nickname
 Sky (disambiguation)
 Walker (disambiguation)